Frostburg State University (FSU) is a public university in Frostburg, Maryland. The university is the only four-year institution of the University System of Maryland west of the Baltimore-Washington passageway in the state's Appalachian highlands. Founded in 1898 by Maryland State Senator, John Leake, Frostburg was selected because the site offered the best suitable location without a cost to the state. Today, the institution is a largely residential university.

With an enrollment of approximately 4,858 students, the university offers 47 undergraduate majors, 16 graduate programs, and a doctorate in educational leadership. The university is accredited by the Middle States Commission on Higher Education and places primary emphasis on its role as a teaching and learning institution.

History

What was "Frostburg State Normal School No. 2" was founded by an act of the Maryland General Assembly, House Bill 742, from the General Appropriation Bill, on March 31, 1898. The bill was offered on the floor by John Leake of Vale Summit in Allegany County:

For the direction of the erection of a building in Frostburg, Allegany County to be known as The State Normal School No. 2, for the sum of $20,000; and for the support of said school when established $5,000 annually, provided, the people of the town of Frostburg furnish the ground for the site of said building and deed the same to the state. 

The State Board of Education selected and the town of Frostburg paid for the two-acre Beall Park as the location of the new school on August 9, 1898. 
The cornerstone was laid in a ceremony on September 4, 1899. The Normal School's first building, Old Main, was positioned in Beall Park to face Loo Street (now known as College Avenue) and to look down Wood Street toward the downtown area of Frostburg.
State Normal School No. 2, the first institution being located in Baltimore and then Towson, opened with its first class on September 15, 1902, with 57 students with Frostburg's first administrator, Principal Dr. Edward D. Murdaugh (November 18, 1853 - May 1925). In 1904, eight students became the first graduates of the college, receiving a diploma and a lifetime teaching certificate. In 1912, a new gymnasium was authorized and completed in 1914. In 1919, a dormitory was opened. In 1925, a second dormitory was opened. In 1927, Allegany Hall, a new auditorium, gymnasium, and heating plant was added. In 1930, a six-room practice elementary school known as the new laboratory school was opened and the campus was extended to 40 acres, taking over the Brownsville area of Frostburg.

The institution's original mission was to train teachers for public school systems statewide. In 1935, the school was renamed "State Teachers' College at Frostburg" (also called Frostburg State Teachers College) and began offering a four-year degree program leading to a Bachelor of Science in elementary education, after expanding the curriculum from two to three years in 1931 and 1934, respectively. Lillian Cleveland Compton served as the first female president of the college from 1945 to 1954. Compton replaced the 21-year President John L. Dunkle. Her mission as president was essentially to prepare the college for its planned closing. Enrollment stood at a mere 62 students in 1945. With outdated facilities and inadequate funding, the college was accredited only by the State Department of Education. As early as 1943, there had arisen in the General Assembly a movement to close the institution, which eventually culminated in the Marbury Report.
The end of World War II brought a drastic change in the college's environment. In 1946, enrollment increased to 274 students, many being admitted under the new G.I. Bill. Though the movement to close the college persisted, it seemed misguided to those on the scene and was roundly opposed by both private citizens and civic groups in Frostburg and Western Maryland. With the strong support of State Superintendent of Schools Thomas Granville Pullen Jr. and Governor William Preston Lane Jr., the General Assembly was petitioned to keep the School open and the Marbury Commission's recommendations died without ever being acted upon. In 1947, the American Council on Education suggested that Frostburg State Teachers College be closed. The report states:

Your Commission does feel obligated to recommend the prompt discontinuance of the State Teachers College at Frostburg. We are convinced that the cost of operating this unit is not justified by the very small number of its graduates who are entering the school system of the state as teachers. In reaching this conclusion, we have been strongly influenced by the report of our survey staff as to the present condition of the physical facilities at Frostburg. It is apparent that the state faces a heavy capital expenditure if operations at that location are to be continued. Frankly, such an outlay seems to us to be an indefensible waste of public money ... The facilities in Towson are adequate to care for all the students at Frostburg who are now studying to become teachers.

Under Compton's leadership, the institution celebrated its 50th anniversary in the 1949–1950 academic year, enrollment grew from 62 students in 1945 to 500 in 1954, the faculty increased from 13 to 34 members, and the size of the campus increased from eight to 40 acres of land. In addition to plant expansion, she initiated programs in curriculum development, adding a program to train junior high school teachers. R. Bowen Hardesty replaced Compton as president in 1955.
The continued southern expansion of the college caused the Brownsville Schools and homes along Park Avenue to be demolished by 1955 to make way for Compton, Allen, and Simpson Halls. A new school-also known as the Lincoln School, and the current home of the university's Public Safety office-was constructed in the late 1950s. However, the building was used for only two years until national integration laws reassigned students to other Frostburg elementary schools. Marking a shift in the educational mission of the institution, the college was granted the right to grant Bachelor of Arts degrees and the master of education degree in 1960.
The school was again renamed in July 1963, this time as Frostburg State College. Frostburg received university status in July 1987, thus being renamed to what it is today, i.e. Frostburg State University.
 Continuing the shift and growth of the university, the institution opened a campus in Hagerstown in 1988, which became the University System of Maryland at Hagerstown in January 2005, and offered its first doctoral degree in 2012.

Presidents

Academics

Frostburg State University offers 47 undergraduate degrees, 80 specialized programs of study, and 16 graduate degrees in its three colleges:

College of Business
College of Education
College of Liberal Arts and Sciences

Frostburg State University holds institutional accreditation through The Middle States Commission on Higher Education and is recognized by the U.S. Secretary of Education and (CHEA) Council for Higher Education Accreditation. The College of Business holds accreditations from the (AACSB) Association to Advance Collegiate Schools of Business.  The College of Education, specified with respective degree programs, holds accreditations from (NCATE) National Council for Accreditation of Teacher Education,(CAAHEP) Commission on Accreditation of Allied Health Education Programs respectively, (CAATE) Commission on Accreditation of Athletic Training Education, and The Council on Accreditation of Parks, Recreation, Tourism and Related Professions (COAPRT). The Counseling Psychology Master's program is accredited by the Masters in Psychology and Counseling Accreditation Council (MPCAC), and allows students to become Licensed Counselors.

Frostburg also incorporates for students, the ability to study 140 locations worldwide. Exchange programs and partnerships has included Mary Immaculate College Exchange Program (Ireland), Beijing Normal University in Beijing (China), ESC Rennes School of Business (France), Nagasaki University Exchange Program (Japan), Baden-Wurttemberg Cooperative State University Exchange Program (Germany), Kyung Hee University Exchange Program (Korea).

Hagerstown center 
Established in January 2005, the University System of Maryland at Hagerstown (USM-H) is a regional higher-education system center located in downtown Hagerstown, Maryland. The center offers upper-level undergraduate classes, as well as master's-level programs. Frostburg State University is one of five universities offering courses at the center. Baccalaureate programs offered by FSU at USMH include: business administration, early childhood education, psychology, sociology, and liberal studies. Graduate programs include: elementary and secondary education.

Unique programs 
The Adventure Sports Concentration is offered as a collaborative program with Garrett College in Western Maryland. Ethnobotany, introduced in 2007, is one of only two of programs in the United States on the cultural use of plants. The program emphasizes experiential learning and practical experiences.

Notable faculty 
 Brad Barkley, author
 Andy Duncan, science-fiction writer

Athletics

On July 5, 2018, the Mountain East Conference announced that Frostburg State University has accepted an offer of membership beginning with the 2019–20 academic year. Full membership will be contingent upon Frostburg State achieving active membership status in NCAA Division II. Beginning in 2020, Frostburg joined the East Coast Conference as an associate member in men's lacrosse, also contingent on being accepted into Division II by the NCAA.

Prior to 2019, Frostburg State University competed at the NCAA Division III level and was a member of the Capital Athletic Conference, as well as participating as an associate member of the New Jersey Athletic Conference for football. However, prior to 2010, FSU was competing as a member of the Allegheny Mountain Collegiate Conference. FSU's football team was a member of the ACFC, but has moved to Empire 8 in 2011. FSU teams have participated in and won many championships, Baseball having the most championship victories. Various club and intramural sports are available on campus.

Student life

News
The Bottom Line is the official news outlet of Frostburg State University. Founded in 1948, the newspaper delivers current news, sports, and entertainment, it is primarily run by its students. The weekly circulation had print peaks of up to 2,500 copies. As of 2013, The Bottom Line relies on web based multimedia as its primary platform. The journalistic intent of the organization is to report news and information that relates to the campus community.

Student government
All students are represented by the three branches of the Student Government Association: the Executive Branch, the Legislative Branch, and the Judicial Branch. The SGA develops and administers student self-government policies, provides services to students, communicates with faculty and administration, and decides how the student activity fees are spent.

Frostburg TV/News
FSU-TV3 is Frostburg State University's 24-hour educational access channel. It is programmed and operated by students in the Department of Mass Communication, located in the Center for Communication and Information Technology. The Frostburg studio is programmed and operated by both students and faculty each semester. FSU-TV3 presents programming including documentaries, concerts, guest speakers, sports, and city council meetings.

Radio

WFWM radio is a public service of Frostburg State University in Frostburg, Maryland. It broadcasts informational, educational, and cultural programming 24 hours a day to the westernmost counties of Maryland and adjacent areas in Pennsylvania and West Virginia.
WFWM operates at an assigned frequency of 91.9 MHz. It also operates a translator station, W242AD (96.3 MHz), in Oakland, Maryland. Some of WFWM's daily programming includes locally produced programming and news, as well as the public syndicate network of National Public Radio, the Associated Press, and National Weather Service. Main transmission facilities are located on Dan's Mountain in Midland, Maryland. WFWM also maintains and assists XFSR, the FSU student intranet radio station.

Greek letter organizations
Frostburg State University has a large number of nationally and internationally recognized fraternities, sororities, academic clubs, and student associations' on-campus. Greek life organizations consist of the National Interfraternity Conference Fraternities, the National Panhellenic Conference Sororities, the National Pan-Hellenic Conference, the Professional Greek Organizations, and the Collegiate Interfraternity Music Council.

Arts and culture

Performing Arts Center

The Woodward D. Pealer Performing Arts Center (PAC) at Frostburg State University is a $19 million facility constructed in 1994. The PAC features three acoustic rehearsal halls and two drama theaters.
The three state-of-the-art performing accommodations contain a 458-seat recital hall, a 338-seat drama theater, and a 150-seat studio theater. It is complete with scenic and costume shops, a box office, practice rooms, faculty and staff offices, dressing rooms, two separate dedicated computer labs and various production facilities.
The PAC showcases major performances in ballet, dance, musicals, plays, vocal and instrumental performances from professional to student performers.

Mountain City Traditional Arts
Mountain City Traditional Arts is dedicated to the education, sales, documentation, and perpetuation of regional art and cultural heritage, and is a partnership of the Allegheny Arts Council, Folklore and Folk life Programming at Frostburg State University, and the Frostburg First Main Street Program.

Children's Literature Centre
The Children's Literature Centre at Frostburg State University is housed within the College of Education. This centre was founded by Dr. William Bingman in 1982 to honor two former education faculty members.

Each year, the centre sponsors the Spring Festival of Children's Literature, which brings together nationally and internationally recognized children's authors and illustrators with teachers, librarians, media specialists, and lovers of children's literature. In 2009, the festival included featured speakers Kadir Nelson, Doreen Rappaport, Matt Tavares, and Gennifer Cholendenko. The centre sponsors several free community events for children, based around children's literature.

Notable alumni

 Kristine Vetulani-Belfoure (1962), Nazi concentration camps survivor, author, and teacher
 James A. Graham (1963), USMC, Medal of Honor recipient
 Henry B. Heller (1964), Democrat, member of Maryland House of Delegates 
 Donald P. Hutchinson (1967), Baltimore County Executive, 1978–86; member of Maryland House of Delegates, 1967–74; and State Senate, 1975–78. 
 John N. Bambacus (1970), former Maryland State Senator, former Mayor of Frostburg 
 Debra Monk (1973), Tony and Emmy award-winning actress, has appeared in movie and television: Bulworth, NYPD Blue, Law and Order, Desperate Housewives, and Grey's Anatomy 
 Bob Maddox (1973), defensive end, Cincinnati Bengals and Kansas City Chiefs
 John Ellinger (1973), American soccer coach, formerly of the Under 17 United States men's national soccer team and Real Salt Lake of Major League Soccer 
 Jim Riggleman (1974), MLB manager, Cincinnati Reds (2018–present), Washington Nationals (2009–2011), Seattle Mariners (2008), Chicago Cubs (1995–1999), and San Diego Padres (1992–1994) 
 Kevin Kelly (1975), member of Maryland House of Delegates 
Richard Robert "Ricky" Arnold II (1985), NASA astronaut, selected in 2004 as an Educator Mission Specialist
 Gary Howell (1990), Republican, member of West Virginia House of Delegates 
 Robert A. McKee (1991), former member of the Maryland House of Delegates 
 Gregory Thomas Garcia (1992), Emmy-winning writer and TV producer,  has referenced Frostburg State University in episodes of Yes, Dear, My Name Is Earl, and Raising Hope
 Heather Perfetti (1995), President of the Middle States Commission on Higher Education
Mike Longabardi (1996), NBA Assistant coach, Washington Wizards (2019–present), Cleveland Cavaliers (2016–2019), Phoenix Suns (2013–2015), Boston Celtics (2007–2013), and Houston Rockets (2003–2007)
Keenan Scott II (2009), playwright whose play Thoughts of a Colored Man will appear on Broadway for the 2021–2022 season

References

External links
Official website
Official athletics webpage
The Bottom Line (student newspaper)

 
Universities and colleges in Allegany County, Maryland
Universities and colleges of Cumberland, MD-WV-PA
1898 establishments in Maryland
Public universities and colleges in Maryland
University System of Maryland campuses
Educational institutions established in 1898